Michaela Vernerová (born 15 September 1973), also known as Michaela Kvačková, is a Czech judoka. She competed at the 1996 Summer Olympics and the 2000 Summer Olympics.

References

External links
 
 

1973 births
Living people
Czech female judoka
Olympic judoka of the Czech Republic
Judoka at the 1996 Summer Olympics
Judoka at the 2000 Summer Olympics
People from Slaný
Universiade silver medalists for the Czech Republic
Universiade medalists in judo
Medalists at the 1999 Summer Universiade
Sportspeople from the Central Bohemian Region